The 2019–20 Coppa Italia Dilettanti was the 55th edition of Coppa Italia Dilettanti. Participants in the competition include all teams of 2019–20 Eccellenza and some teams of 2019–20 Promozione, the fifth and sixth tier of the Italian football pyramid, respectively. The winner of the competition were promoted to 2020–21 Serie D.

Due to the COVID-19 pandemic in Italy, on 20 May 2020, Lega Nazionale Dilettanti decided not to complete the competition.

Format 

All the teams of 2019–20 Eccellenza participate in the competition together with some 2019–20 Promozione teams who are invited to participate.

The winners of Regional Cups qualify for the main competition. 

The national stage consists of 8 groups. Three groups consist of 3 teams, the remaining five consist of 2 teams.

The teams participating in the national phase are included in the groups following this scheme.

Group A: Liguria, Lombardy, Piedmont/Vallé d'Aoste

Group B: Friuli Venezia Giulia, Trentino, Trentino-Alto Adige/Südtirol, Veneto

Group C: Emilia-Romagna, Tuscany

Group D: Marche, Umbria

Group E: Lazio, Sardinia

Group F: Abruzzo, Molise

Group G: Basilicata, Campania, Apulia

Group H: Calabria, Sicily

The matches, in the three-team groups, are one-legged. Matches in two-team groups are two-legged. The winners of the eight groups go through to the quarter-finals. The quarter-finals and semi-finals are two-legged, while the final is one-legged.

All teams must field at least one player born after 1 January 2000 and one after 1 January 2001.

Teams

Winners of regional cups 

 Abruzzo: Torrese
 Apulia: Corato
 Basilicata: Vultur
 Calabria: San Luca
 Campania: Acragolese
 Emilia-Romagna: Virtus Castelfranco
 Friuli Venezia Giulia: Manzanese
 Lazio: Real Monterotondo Scalo
 Liguria: Sestri Levante
Lombardy: Casatese
Marche: Forsempronese
Molise: Tre Pini Matese
Piedmont/Aosta Valley: Chisola
Sardinia: Carbonia
Sicily: Giarre
Tuscany: San Marco Avenza
Trentino-South Tyrol: Trento
Umbria: Tiferno Lecchi
Veneto: Sandonà 1922

Group stage

Group A

Group B

Group C

Group D

Group E

Group F

Group G

Group H

Knock-out stage

Quarter-finals

First leg

Second leg

Notes

References

Football in Italy
2019–20 in Italian football
2019–20 Coppa Italia Dilettanti